The International Journal of Play Therapy is a peer-reviewed academic journal published by the American Psychological Association on behalf of the Association of Play Therapy. The journal was established in 1992 and covers all aspects of play therapy. The editor-in-chief is Franc Hudspeth (Sacred Heart University).

Abstracting and indexing 
The journal is abstracted and indexed in PsycINFO.

References

External links 
 

American Psychological Association academic journals
English-language journals
Psychotherapy journals
Publications established in 1992
Quarterly journals